Cryptocheilus notatus is the largest species of spider wasps (Pompilidae) to be found in Great Britain reaching up to 18mm in length.

Biology
Cryptocheilus notatus constructs multi-celled nests and they require quite substantial pre-existing cavities, the wasp does very little digging herself.  Nesting sites have included mammal burrows, notably those of the European Mole (Talpa europaea), but it will utilise disused invertebrate nest sites, which it will expand.

Prey recorded in Britain includes Drassodes cupreus, a large nocturnal ground spider from the Gnaphosidae.

Habitat
Associated with woodland edges.  In Britain it is associated with warm lowland heaths.

Distribution
Europe and the Middle East.  In Britain it is only found in the southern heathlands from Kent west to Cornwall, with concentrations in Surrey and Hampshire.  In Europe has been recorded in Spain, France, Belgium, Netherlands, Switzerland, Italy, Germany and Poland.  It has also been found in Turkey, east to Iran and Central Asia.

References

External links
Images representing Cryptocheilus notatus at Barcodes of Life

Pepsinae
Hymenoptera of Asia
Hymenoptera of Europe
Insects described in 1792
Taxa named by Pietro Rossi